Gerburg Jahnke (born 18 January 1955, in Oberhausen-Osterfeld) is a German comedian.

Life 
After school in Oberhausen Jahnke studied arts and German studies in Münster and Düsseldorf. Jahnke is best known in Germany for her work as a comedian. Together with Stephanie Überall she had a comedy group Missfits.

See also 

 German television comedy
 List of German comedians

References

External links 
 Official website Gerburg Jahnke 

German women comedians
1955 births
Living people
People from Oberhausen